The secretary of state of Nevada is a statewide elected office in the State of Nevada. The secretary of state post is common to many U.S. states. In Nevada, it is a constitutional office (i.e., it is mandated by the Constitution of Nevada).

The current secretary of state, Democrat Cisco Aguilar, was elected in 2022. Aguilar was preceded by Barbara Cegavske, who served as secretary of state from 2015 to 2023.

Organization 
The Nevada Secretary of State's Office is composed of five divisions:
 The Commercial Recordings Division has offices in Carson City, Reno and Las Vegas.  It registers business organizations and keeps their documentation up to date.  This division also registers trade names, trademarks, service marks, rights of publicity, and filings pursuant to the Uniform Commercial Code.
 The Elections Division is located in the Capitol Building in Carson City. The Division certifies candidates, registers and files Candidate Contribution and Expenditure Reports, certifies ballot questions, supervises elections, and reports and certifies the results of state primary and general elections. The Division also administers the state's Confidential Address Program for victims of domestic violence.
 The Notary Division of the Secretary of State's office is responsible for appointing, training, and disciplining the notaries public within the state of Nevada. The Division is also charged with administering the state's digital signature laws and with notarizing apostilles. The Division is located in Carson City.
 The Operations Division of the Secretary of State’s office manages important internal functions of the office including accounting, budget and information technology (IT). This division is responsible for the office’s $20 million budget and more than $100 million in annual revenues realized by the office. The IT component oversees the development and maintenance of the electronic Secretary of State (eSoS) application, statewide voter database, the agency’s website and other important applications and tools.
 The Securities Division is located in Las Vegas, with a satellite office in Reno. The Securities Division is charged with the regulation of the state's securities industry. The Division licenses individuals who sell securities, registers securities offerings, and enforces the civil and criminal provisions of the state's securities laws. The Securities Division also is tasked with licensing sports agents, pursuant to the Athletes Agent Act of 2001.

Other duties 
The Secretary of State acts as the official record-keeper of the state of Nevada, and is the keeper of the State Seal of Nevada.  The Secretary also maintains the official bond of the state treasurer, and serves on the State Board of Prison Commissioners, the State Board of Examiners, the Tahoe Regional Planning Agency Governing Board, the State Records Committee, the State Advisory Committee on Participatory Democracy and the Executive Branch Audit Committee.

The Secretary also maintains the state's registry of living wills and advance medical directives, and maintains a list of ministers and clergy in the state.

Additional 
In 2004, under the leadership of then Secretary of State Dean Heller, Nevada became the first state in the nation to implement an auditable paper trail to electronic voting machines.

List of secretaries of state

Secretaries of state of the Territory of Nevada

Secretaries of state of the State of Nevada

See also
 Government of Nevada

References